Greatest Hits: 1979–1990 is a compilation album by American singer Dionne Warwick. It was released by Arista Records on October 31, 1989 in the United States. The album compromises all singles Warwick released with Arista after leaving her previous label Warner Bros. Records in 1978. It peaked at number 177 on the US Billboard 200.

Critical reception

AllMusic editor Ron Wynn wrote that while Barry Manilow, Barry Gibb, and Luther Vandross returned Warwick "to the elaborately arranged and structured soul-tinged pop that had marked her finest hits," he found that "the lyrics and compositions weren't as consistent as they were during her Burt Bacharach/Hal David period."

Track listing

 Title15         = "A House is Not a Home" 03.06

Charts

References

1989 greatest hits albums
Dionne Warwick compilation albums
Arista Records compilation albums